The 110th district of the Texas House of Representatives consists of southern portions of the city of Dallas. The current Representative is Toni Rose, who has represented the district since 2013.

A portion of both major highway TX-45 and the Trinity River go through the district.

References 

110